Hồ Văn Thuận  (born 14 July 1985) is a Vietnamese former footballer who is last known to have played as a midfielder for Quảng Nam.

Career

Before the 2015 season, Hồ signed for Vietnamese side Quang Nam, where he made 36 league appearances and scored 4 goals, helping them win their only league title. On 4 January 2015, he debuted for Quang Nam during a 0-0 draw with Cần Thơ. On 25 January 2015, Hồ scored his first 2 goals for Quang Nam during a 3-1 win over Đồng Nai.

References

External links

 

Vietnamese footballers
V.League 1 players
Quang Nam FC players
Living people
1985 births
Haiphong FC players
Association football midfielders
Can Tho FC players
Hoang Anh Gia Lai FC players